Alexandru Raicu (born 20 December 1996) is a Romanian judoka. He competed in the men's 73 kg event at the 2020 Summer Olympics in Tokyo, Japan.

He is the 2021 Judo Grand Slam Tel Aviv champion in the - 73 kg class.

References

External links 
 

1996 births
Living people
Romanian male judoka
Judoka at the 2019 European Games
Judoka at the 2020 Summer Olympics
Olympic judoka of Romania
20th-century Romanian people
21st-century Romanian people